Charles Arthur Howeson (born November 1949) is a former Royal Navy commander who was known as "Mr Plymouth". He was chairman of First Great Western and the South West Strategic Health Authority. He held a senior position at Coutts bank. Howeson Lane in Plymouth is named after him after he donated the land on which it was built. In June 2018 he was jailed for seven years and six months for sexually abusing eight men. One offence was committed while he was a lieutenant commander on HMS Cleopatra. Other sexual assault offences on volunteer workers were committed by him during his tenure at Groundwork Plymouth Area in the early 1990s. These latter offences were not appropriately dealt with at the time.

References

Living people
1949 births
Royal Navy officers
British business executives
English people convicted of indecent assault
Violence against men in the United Kingdom